Jaywick Martello Tower is a renovated Martello tower at Jaywick,  south-west of Clacton-on-Sea, Essex. It now functions as an arts, heritage and community venue.

History
The tower was one of several Martello towers on the east coast of England. They were constructed to defend the country against invasion by Napoleon Bonaparte and his armies. In total, 103 Martello towers were built between 1804 and 1812, 74 were built between 1804 and 1808 along the Kent and Sussex coast from Folkestone to Seaford, and 29 along the east coast between Point Clear near St Osyth and Aldeburgh from 1809 to 1812. The south coast towers were numbered 1 – 74 and the east coast towers were lettered A – Z. Three other east coast towers are known as AA, BB and CC. The tower at Jaywick is Tower D.

The tower was constructed from around 750,000 London Clay bricks manufactured at Grays and transported by barge. The roof held three sea-facing cannon, usually one heavier gun flanked by two smaller howitzers. The tower at Jaywick retains the installations for the cannon.

In 1904, the tower was sold by the War Office and became part of a golf course.

Arts venue

In 2005 the tower opened as a gallery space and arts venue managed by Essex County Council. It also provides a venue for a range of projects and events including community workshops, living history experiences, and live music. In 2011, a couple got married in the tower. In 2019, the tower hosted a meeting to discuss actions following Historic England reporting that several Martello Towers along this stretch of coast are in need of serious repairs.

See also
Soft Ices, a Jaywick-based arts project

References
Citations

Sources

 
 

Towers completed in 1809
Buildings and structures in Essex
Napoleonic war forts in England
Martello towers
Clacton-on-Sea